Alain David may refer to:
 Alain David (sprinter)
 Alain David (politician)